George Lilley may refer to:

 George L. Lilley (1859–1909), United States Representative and Governor of Connecticut
 George W. Lilley (1850–1904), American academic, professor of mathematics and university president